The Rotax 277 is a , single-cylinder, two-stroke aircraft engine, that was built by BRP-Rotax GmbH & Co. KG of Austria for use in ultralight aircraft.

Development

The Rotax 277 features a single piston ported, air-cooled cylinder head and cylinder, utilizing either a fan or free air for cooling. Lubrication is pre-mixed fuel and oil. The 277 has a single Bosch flywheel magneto generator 12 volt ignition system and is equipped with a 36 mm Bing double float carburetor, with either a hand lever or cable choke.

The Rotax 277 is no longer in production.

Applications

Specifications (277)

See also

References

Air-cooled aircraft piston engines
Rotax engines
Two-stroke aircraft piston engines